Mathieu Ferland (born January 26, 1974) is a Canadian video game producer best known for producing the Tom Clancy's Splinter Cell series for Ubisoft Montreal. IGN has named him the 75th greatest game creator of all time .

Notable games
 Tom Clancy's Splinter Cell (2002)
 Tom Clancy's Splinter Cell: Pandora Tomorrow (2004)
 Tom Clancy's Splinter Cell: Chaos Theory (2005)
 Assassin's Creed (2007)
 Tom Clancy's Splinter Cell: Double Agent (2008)
 Tom Clancy's Splinter Cell: Conviction 2010

External links
Interview at Game reviews
Interview at Edge-online
Mathieu Ferland at MobyGames

Living people
Video game producers
1974 births
People from Montreal
Ubisoft people